Pasqual is the Catalan equivalent of the Spanish given name Pascual, and a Venetian variant of Italian given name Pasquale. Pasqual is also a surname found in Spain (especially among the inhabitants of Catalan-speaking areas, including Andorrans, Valencians, Balearics) and in Italy (especially in Veneto, including Lombardy and Piedmont).

Pasqual, like Pasquale (Italian), Pascal (French), Pascoal (Portuguese) and Pascual (Spanish), derives from the Late Latin paschalis or pashalis,  which means "relating to Easter" from Latin pascha ("Easter"), Greek Πάσχα, Aramaic pasḥā, in turn from the Hebrew pesach, which means "to be born on, or to be associated with, Passover day". Since the Hebrew holiday Passover coincides closely with the later Christian holiday of Easter, the Latin word came to be used for both occasions.

The names Pasquale, Paschal, Pascal, Pascale, Pascha, Pascoe and Pasco are all variations of Pasqual. The feminine form, rather rare, is Pasquala, Pasqualina, Pascale, Pascalle or Pascalina. As a surname in Italy Pasqual has many variations found all over the country: Pasquali, De Pasqual, Pascale, Pascali, Pascalis, De Pascal, De Pasquali, De Pasquale, Di Pasquale, Di Pascali, De Pasqualis, Pasqualin, Pasqualon. As a given name and surname in Spanish-speaking countries Pasqual is often spelled Pascual.

Pasqual may refer to:

Given name
 Pasqual Coco (born 1977), a former Dominican pitcher in Major League Baseball
 Pasqual Ferry (sometimes credited as Paschalis, Pascual or Pascal), a Spanish comic book artist and penciller
 Pasqual Maragall (born 1941), the 127th President of Generalitat de Catalunya
 Pasqual Sanchis Moscardó (born 1963), a Valencian pilota professional player 
 Pasqual Scanu (1908 - 1978), an Italian writer in Catalan and Italian

Surname
 Anupa Pasqual (born 1964), Sri Lankan politician
 Ernest Benach i Pasqual (born 1959), a Catalan politician, President of the Catalan Parliament
 Keerthi Pasquel (born 1955), Sri Lankan Sinhala pop musician
 Manuel Pasqual (born 1982), an Italian footballer for ACF Fiorentina
 Sudath Prajiv Pasqual (born 1961), a former Sri Lankan cricketer

Other
 Pasqual Maragall Foundation, a public foundation in Catalonia, Spain 
 Pasqual, Romansh name of Paspels, municipality in the district of Hinterrhein in the Swiss canton of Graubünden.
 Battle of San Pasqual (also spelled San Pascual), a military encounter during the Mexican–American War
 San Pasqual Handicap, an American Thoroughbred horse race run at Santa Anita Park, California, United States
 San Pasqual High School (Escondido, California), a public high school in Escondido, California, United States
 San Pasqual Valley, a community of the city of San Diego, California, United States

See also
 San Pasqual (disambiguation)
 Pascual (disambiguation)
 Pascal (disambiguation)
 Paschal (disambiguation)
 Pasquale (disambiguation)

Italian masculine given names
Spanish masculine given names
Catalan-language surnames
Italian-language surnames